Holly Earl (born 31 August 1992) is an English actress. She is best known for her role as Zoe in Cuckoo, Kela in Beowulf: Return to the Shieldlands, Agnes in the Channel 4 TV series Humans and Nita Clements in the BBC medical drama Casualty.

Early life
Earl is from Ealing, West London. She attended Drayton Manor High School. Her older sister Elizabeth Earl is a former child actress and Disney PR expert and founded the PR agency Munch.

Career
Earl made her television debut at the age of four, playing Robson Green's daughter in Touching Evil. She then appeared in the BBC Christmas special The Greatest Store in the World (1999). This was followed by her first film role as May Bailey in Possession (2002). She appeared in the popular shows Doctor Who, Skins, and Cuckoo. In 2012, she made her stage debut as Bertha in The Father at the Belgrade Theatre. She later received an Ian Charleson Award nomination for her role.

Filmography

Film

Television

Video games

References

External links
 
 
 Holly Earl CV at AJ Management Website

Living people
1992 births
20th-century English actresses
21st-century English actresses
Actresses from London
English child actresses
English film actresses
English stage actresses
English television actresses
People educated at Drayton Manor High School
People from Ealing